Ciudad Deportiva (English: Sports City) may refer to:

Ciudad Deportiva, Madrid sports complex, Spain
Ciudad Deportiva, Nuevo Laredo sports complex, Mexico
Ciudad Deportiva, Mexicali, sports complex in Mexicali, Mexico
Ciudad Deportiva metro station, Mexico City
Coliseo de la Ciudad Deportiva, Havana, Cuba

See also